For the Moment is a 1993 film written and directed by Aaron Kim Johnston and starring Russell Crowe and Christianne Hirt. The plot revolves around airmen training in rural Manitoba, Canada, with the British Commonwealth Air Training Plan during the Second World War. The main focus of the story is the wartime romance between Russell Crowe's character and a local girl. Johnston was inspired to write the screenplay based upon the stories of his father who was an instructor and bomber pilot in the war, and his mother's experiences as a young woman on the home front.

Plot
In the summer of 1942, something is dramatically changing for the small community of Brandon, Manitoba as hundreds of young men from all over the world descend on this sleepy hamlet. In this newly found excitement of meeting newcomers, Lill (Christianne Hirt), a young prairie farm wife whose husband is already overseas for two years, and LAC Lachlan Curry (Russell Crowe), a gallant Australian airman are fated to meet. He has come to train at the Royal Canadian Air Force air base nearby to become a pilot. His friend, LAC Johnny Crouch (Peter Outerbridge) who has struck up a relationship with Lill's younger sister, Kate (Sara McMillan), introduces Lachlan to Lill.

During a languid moment, Lachlan recites to Lill the poem, "High Flight" by fellow airman, John Gillespie Magee, Jr. which epitomizes what he is going through in his training. Lill recognizes the poem as it had been widely distributed after the death of the young airman who had penned it. The young lovers also have a kinship with another unlikely pairing, Betsy (Wanda Cannon), a bootlegging charmer who sells more than alcohol and also has a husband away in the army and two children to look after, and Zeek Williams (Scott Kraft), the flying station's chief flight instructor from Chicago.

The short period that they have together is punctuated by the strain of dangerous wartime training and their inevitable realization that there is little time left for them. Lachlan has to deal with death from all sides, first when "Scotty" (Robert G. Slade), the trainee who bunks next to him, commits suicide. More devastating is the death of Lill's brother, Dennis (Kelly Proctor) that leads her to a fateful decision to end their relationship, and her sister to cancel wedding plans. When Zeek crashes on the edge of the field, he extracts a cruel promise from Lachlan who later seeks out Betsy to tell her what he had to do. At the wings parade, a farewell to the trainees who have earned their wings who will be shortly sent off to war, Lachlan and Lill are unable to reconcile, but Kate remains true to Johnny, saying she will be there when he comes back. Across the parade square, Lachlan and Lill share a final moment, saying goodbye quietly, with a phrase he has taught her, "Fair dinkum."

Cast
As appearing in screen credits (main roles identified):

Production

Director Aaron Kim Johnston had a serendipitous moment in selecting the lead actor. Russell Crowe's name was on the top of a list and although he had not been acting long, the initial reviews of his earlier films were promising, with a handful of awards for his roles as both supporting and lead actor.  Johnston said the actor’s combination of presence, magnetism and skill results in a "real person to put in front of the camera. He’s quite a perfectionist – he’s very professional," Johnston said. "He approaches his craft and work with great intensity and preparation and a sense of perfectionism that is consummate. That’s why he is where he is." "... I think he likes to be a maverick."

With principal photography taking place over August–September 1992, one of the first jobs for the production was to scout possible locations. The film was shot at former Royal Canadian Air Force stations in Manitoba used in the British Commonwealth Air Training Plan, including Brandon Municipal Airport, Brandon Airport's auxiliary aerodrome at Chater, and Rivers. The Brandon Commonwealth Air Training Plan Museum became the primary filming location, utilizing its extensive collection of period equipment and aircraft. The museum's aircraft are mainly static and although some were flight-ready, refurbishing and obtaining insurance was required to fly some of the types, including the de Havilland Tiger Moth and North American Harvard trainers, featured in key aerial scenes. Farms around Brandon stood in for various film locales while other Brandon landmarks including a church and the main street area was actually Carberry, Manitoba. Local residents were prominently involved as extras in many of the town scenes. The dance hall sequence was filmed in Albert Johnson's Palladium, a long-time dance emporium on Rosser Avenue, Brandon, which resulted in the partial refurbishing of the site. A swing band provided the music.

Aircraft used in the production
 Avro Anson Mk V
 Bristol Bolingbroke IVT
 Cessna Crane IA
 de Havilland Canada DH.82C Tiger Moth 
 Douglas A-26B Invader
 North American Harvard II
 Stinson L-5 Sentinel

Reception
Praised for its cinematography, music (the strains of Pachelbel's Canon begins and ends the film) and faithful depiction of the era, the romantic subplots in For the Moment were nonetheless seen as laboured or clumsy. James Berardinelli characterized it as "Nicely photographed and appealingly acted ... The film is obvious, and occasionally clumsy ... (yet) 'For the Moment' says something about the ephemeral nature of human existence, the uncertainty of everyone's future, and the longing we often experience for the 'road not traveled'." Kim Williamson had similar reservations, indicating that while "... some scenes and their dialogue are electric with simple humanity ... Still, 'For the Moment,' a movie about moments, is only made of them." Stephen Holden's review in The New York Times identified the same dichotomy in describing the film as "better at portraying the intimacy of families and lovers than at telling a story ... (although) 'For the Moment' satisfies a sweet tooth with such calm and intelligent deliberation that you won't leave feeling as though you have just indulged in a guilty pleasure."

Awards
For the Moment received Genie Award nominations for Scott Kraft as Best Supporting Actor and Wanda Cannon for Best Supporting Actress at the 15th Genie Awards. Andrew Deskin and Mark Andrew Webb went on to win the Best Art Direction Award at the 1995 Blizzard Awards while the film won the Most Popular Canadian Film Award at the 1993 Vancouver International Film Festival.

Home video
After its formal premiere in 1993 at the Vancouver International Film Festival, For the Moment was first released in Canada and later released in the United States in 1996. A home video was released in VHS format in 2003, followed up by a DVD widescreen release in 2004, offering English and Spanish subtitles. A later Canadian DVD version provided a small number of special features including behind-the-scenes photographs and biographies/filmographies on Aaron Kim Johnson, Christianne Hirt and Russell Crowe. As of 2013, the video versions are no longer available as the distribution rights to the production are no longer in effect.

References

Notes

Citations

Bibliography

 Barris, Ted. Behind The Glory: The Plan that Won the Allied Air War. Markham, Ontario: Thomas Allen & Son Publishers, 2005. .
 Dunmore, Spencer. Wings For Victory. Toronto: McClelland and Stewart, 1994. .
 Wallace, Stone and Nicholle Carriere. Russell Crowe: Maverick With A Heart. Edmonton, Alberta, Canada: Icon Press, 2005. .
 Winchester, Jim, ed. "Douglas A-20 Boston/Havoc." Aircraft of World War II (The Aviation Factfile). Kent, UK: Grange Books plc, 2004. .

External links
 
 
 
 

1993 films
Canadian aviation films
Aviation in Manitoba
English-language Canadian films
World War II aviation films
War romance films
Films shot in Manitoba
Films set in Manitoba
Canadian romantic drama films
1990s English-language films
1990s Canadian films